Olivia Montauban (born 26 August 1991) is a track cyclist from  France. She represented her nation at the 2015 UCI Track Cycling World Championships.

Career results

2011
2nd Sprint, UEC European U23 Track Championships
2012
UEC European U23 Track Championships
2nd Sprint
3rd 500m Time Trial
2013
2nd Keirin, UEC European U23 Track Championships
3rd Keirin, Revolution – Round 2, Glasgow
2014
International Belgian Open
1st Keirin
1st Sprint
Fenioux Trophy Piste
2nd Sprint
3rd 500m Time Trial
3rd Sprint, Fenioux Piste International
2015
2nd Keirin, Open des Nations sur Piste de Roubaix

References

External links
 
 

1991 births
Living people
French female cyclists
People from Les Abymes
Guadeloupean cyclists